Miassky (masculine), Miasskaya (feminine), or Miasskoye (neuter) is the name of several rural localities in Russia:
Miassky (rural locality), a settlement in Bayramgulovsky Selsoviet of Argayashsky District of Chelyabinsk Oblast
Miasskoye, a selo in Miassky Selsoviet of Krasnoarmeysky District of Chelyabinsk Oblast